The Mangamaire River is a river of the centre of New Zealand's North Island. One of the headwaters of the Rangitikei River system, it flows generally southwest from its origins southeast of Lake Taupo, forming part of the border of the Kaimanawa Forest Park for much of its length.

The New Zealand Ministry for Culture and Heritage gives a translation of "maire stream" for Mangamaire.

See also
List of rivers of New Zealand

References

Rivers of Manawatū-Whanganui
Rivers of New Zealand